La Gloriosa may refer to:
Glorious Revolution (Spain)
Spanish Republican Air Force